Mesosaimia is a genus of longhorn beetles of the subfamily Lamiinae, containing the following species:

 Mesosaimia robusta Breuning, 1938
 Mesosaimia similis (Breuning, 1950)
 Mesosaimia wakaharai Yamasako, 2014
 Mesosamia mausoni (Breuning, 1950)

References

Mesosini